Badminton Australia (BA) is the top governing body for badminton in Australia. It is committed to promoting the awareness and development of badminton within Australia and is also responsible for the management of international badminton relations + events. Junior events such as the June Bevan Teams Event or CP Maddern Trophy with their respective Australasian Championships, along with the Australian Closed Championships are also organised and run by Badminton Australia.

History
Badminton has been existent in Australia since the early 1900s, especially within regions in Victoria. The official Australian Badminton Association was formed in 1932, and shortly after, Australia became the 11th member of the International Badminton Federation. In 1936, it founded the development of the Oceania Badminton Confederation alongside New Zealand. This is now known as Badminton Oceania.

The current national office for BA resides in Melbourne, Victoria.

Achievements
Australia is yet to be a competitive nation in the field of badminton, in the context of current Asian and European/Scandinavian dominance. However, at the 1992 Barcelona Olympics Anna Lao reached the quarterfinals in the women's singles, doubles and mixed and was overall ranked 5th in the world for each of those events.

Another noticeable achievement is from Sze Yu. He was runners-up at the 1985 World Badminton Grand Prix. Silver-medallist in men's singles at the 1986 Commonwealth Games. He was also the Winner of the 1988 U.S. Open Badminton Championships.

When commenting on Australian players at the 2008 Beijing Olympics, BA's Chief Executive Paul Brettell has stated that 'A bad draw will see [the Australian players] out after their first game' and that 'Australia's greatest achievement is just qualifying for the event'. These statements reflect the current status of badminton within Australia, with Anna Lao's performance in the Barcelona Olympics being one of the few exceptions.

Further, according to the Sydney Morning Herald, badminton was one of just 2 Australian sports (the other being Rugby Sevens) not to win a medal at the 2006 Melbourne Commonwealth Games

Recent performances at the 2008 Olympics have reinforced this viewpoint, with all Australians knocked out of their respective first matches.

However, there appears to be a resurgence in Australian badminton with a strong performance at the 2012 London Olympics where Leanne Choo and Renuga Veeran reached the quarterfinals of the women's doubles event.

See also

 Badminton World Federation
 Badminton Oceania
 Badminton Victoria

References

External links
 

Badminton in Australia
Australia
Sports governing bodies in Australia
1932 establishments in Australia
Sports organizations established in 1932
Organisations based in Melbourne